Ronald Lindley Meek (27 July 1917 – 18 August 1978) was a Marxian economist and social scientist known especially for his scholarly studies of classical political economy and the labour theory of value. During the 1960s and 1970s, his writings had a strong influence on the Western academic discussion about Marx's economic theory.

Life and career
Meek was born in Wellington, New Zealand, where he attended school and entered Victoria University in the mid-1930s, initially to study law, and later economics. There he became interested in the thought of Karl Marx, theatre and local left-wing politics. Some of his articles of that period in New Zealand journals like Spike, Salient and Tomorrow were written under pseudonyms. In 1939, he graduated with a Masters in Law, and was awarded a fellowship to Cambridge University. However, World War II intervened and his graduate studies at Cambridge were delayed for six years.

In 1944, he married a communist activist, Rona Stephenson (better known as Rona Bailey), though they were soon divorced again. Meek revealed himself to be the brightest Marxian thinker of his generation in New Zealand; his first monograph, a pamphlet called "Maori Problems Today" (1943), discussed a topic which had previously been largely ignored by the Communist Party of New Zealand. His 1946 lecture to the Wellington Branch of the New Zealand Geographical Society on Maori emancipation was published in the New Zealand Geographer.

In 1946 Meek moved to Cambridge, England, with a Strathcona studentship to read for a Ph.D. under Piero Sraffa and Maurice Dobb. Two years later, in October 1948, he moved to Glasgow, Scotland, where he became university lecturer in the Department of Political Economy, and in 1949 he finished his doctoral thesis, "The development of the concept of surplus in economic thought from Mun to Mill". He also remarried and learnt to play the piano. Meek was lecturer in Political Economy at the University of Glasgow until 1959, and Senior Lecturer from 1960 to 1963. 

His first major work, Studies in the Labour Theory of Value, was published by Lawrence & Wishart in 1956 (a second edition was published by Monthly Review Press in 1973). The book was widely read and had a big influence on the discussions of Marxian, Ricardian and Post-Keynesian economists in the 1960s and 1970s. In 1956 Meek also quit the Communist Party of Great Britain and he abandoned his previous support for the policies of Joseph Stalin, although he continued to be a Marxist until his last years. He was acknowledged to be a scholarly authority on Adam Smith and on the Physiocrats. In the introduction to an article from 1971, "Smith, Turgot and the 'Four Stages' Theory," Ron Meek writes: "In the good old days, when I was a fierce young Marxist instead of a benign middle-aged Meeksist, I became very interested in the work of the members of the so-called Scottish historical school..."

From 1963 until his death he was Tyler Professor of Economics at the University of Leicester, where he initiated a B.Sc. course in Economics and a Public Sector Economics Research Centre. He published numerous books and articles on classical political economy, Marxian and Sraffian economics, as well as on electricity pricing and social theory.

According to the testimony of Eileen Appelbaum,

Books by Ronald Meek
 Studies in the Labor Theory of Value, 1956
 The Economics of Physiocracy: Essays and Translations, 1962
 Hill-walking in Arran, 1963
 The rise and fall of the concept of the economic machine, 1965
 Economics and Ideology and Other Essays, 1967
 Marx and Engels on the population bomb (selections from the writings of Marx and Engels dealing with the theories of Thomas Robert Malthus. Edited by Ronald L. Meek. Translations from the German by Dorothea L. Meek and Ronald L. Meek), 1971
 Figuring out society, 1971
 Quesnay's Tableau Economique, 1972 (with Margaret Kuczynski)
 Turgot on Progress, Sociology and Economics, 1973
 Precursors of Adam Smith, 1973
 Social Science and the Ignoble Savage, 1976
 Smith, Marx and After: Ten Essays in the Development of Economic Thought, 1977.
 Adam Smith: Lectures in Jurisprudence, 1978 (edited with D.D. Raphael & P. G. Stein)
 Matrices and society (with Ian Bradley). Princeton: Princeton University Press, 1987.

Selected articles by Ronald Meek
 "The Rehabilitation of Ricardo", The Listener, 4 Oct 1951
 "New Light on the Labour Theory of Value", The Listener, 7 Aug 1952
 The Scottish Contribution to Marxist Sociology", 1954, in Saville, editor, Democracy and the Labour Movement
 "Adam Smith and the Classical Concept of Profits", June 1954, Scottish Journal of Political Economy
 "The Decline of Ricardian Economics in England", 1950, Economica
 "Stalin as an Economist", 1953, RES
 "Smith, Turgot and the Four Stages Theory", 1971, History of Political Economy 1971
 "Marxism and Marginalism", History of Political Economy 1972
 "The Falling Rate of Profit", 1976, in Howard and King, editor, Economics of Marx

Commentaries on Ronald Meek
Ronald L. Meek,  July 27, 1917-August 18, 1978." In: Journal of Post Keynesian Economics, Vol. 1, No. 3, Spring, 1979, pp. 123-125.
 Ian Bradley and Michael Howard, eds., Classical and Marxian Political Economy. Essays in honour of Ronald Meek. London: Macmillan, 1982. (contains a bibliography of Meek's scholarly articles).
Andrew Skinner, "Ronald Lindley Meek". In: John Eatwell, Murray Milgate, Peter Newman (eds.), Marxian economics. London: Macmillan Press, 1990, p. 286-288.
 Michael C. Howard and John E. King, “Ronald Meek”, in: History of Political Economy, Volume 35, Number 3, Fall 2003.
 Howard, M.C. & King, J.E. (2001). "Ronald Meek and the rehabilitation of surplus economics", in S.G. Medema & W.J. Samuels (eds), Historians of Economics and Economic Thought, London: Routledge, 185-213.
 "Ronald L. Meek", article in A Biographical Dictionary of Dissenting Economists edited by Philip Arestis and Malcolm C. Sawyer.
 Geoffrey Harcourt, "Ronald Meek's “Magnificent” Review Article of Piero Sraffa's 1960 Classic: Top Hit in Decade 1954–63". Scottish Journal of Political Economy, Vol. 60, issue 5, 2013, pp. 478-480.

References

1917 births
1978 deaths
New Zealand economists
Marxian economists
Historians of economic thought
People from Wellington City
New Zealand Marxists
Academics of the University of Leicester
20th-century British historians